The Courten Baronetcy, of Aldington in the County of Worcester, was a title in the Baronetage of England. It was created on 18 May 1622 for Peter Courten, the son of the wealthy merchant Sir William Courten. The title became extinct on Courten's early death in 1624.

Courten baronets, of Aldington (1622)
Sir Peter Courten, 1st Baronet (–1624)

References

Extinct baronetcies in the Baronetage of England
1622 establishments in England